The Ghazipur City–Anand Vihar Terminal, Suhaildev Superfast Express is a Superfast train belonging to Northern Railway zone that runs between  and  in India. It is currently being operated with 22433/22434 train numbers on Bi-weekly basis.

Service

The 22433/Ghazipur–Anand Vihar Terminal, Suhaildev Superfast Express has an average speed of 55 km/hr and covers 834 km in 15h 10m. The 22419/Suhaildev Superfast Express has an average speed of 58 km/hr and covers 834 km in 14h 20m.

Route and halts 

The important halts of the train are:

Coach composition

The train has standard LHB rake with max speed of 130 kmph. The train consists of 21 coaches:

 1 AC First-class
 1 AC II Tier
 3 AC III Tier
 7 Sleeper coaches
 6 General
 2 Head-on Generation

Schedule

Rake sharing

22419/22420 – Suhaildev Superfast Express

See also 

 Anand Vihar Terminal railway station
 Ghazipur City railway station
 Suhaildev Superfast Express

Notes

References

External links 

 22433/Ghazipur City - Anand Vihar Terminal, Suhaildev Superfast Express India Rail Info
 22434/Anand Vihar Terminal - Ghazipur City, Suhaildev Superfast Express India Rail Info

Transport in Delhi
Transport in Ghazipur
Express trains in India
Rail transport in Delhi
Rail transport in Uttar Pradesh
Railway services introduced in 2017